is a national college in the city of Motosu, Gifu Prefecture, Japan. It is sometimes abbreviated as Gifu Kosen (岐阜高専|Gifu Kosen).

Department and Advanced course
The following department and advanced course programs are offered.

Departments
Department of Mechanical Engineering
Department of Electrical and Computer Engineering
Department of Electronic Control Engineering
Department of Civil Engineering
Department of Architecture
General Education

Advanced Course
Electronic System Engineering
Architecture and Civil Engineering

Campus

Notable people
Toshitaka Katada, Professor of Gunma University
Akiko Kikuchi, Fashion Model

External links
National Institute of Technology, Gifu College (Official site)

Engineering universities and colleges in Japan
Architecture schools
Motosu, Gifu